Wilde Salomé is a 2011 American docudrama written, directed by, and starring Al Pacino. An exploration of Oscar Wilde's 1891 play Salomé, the film premiered at the 68th Venice International Film Festival. At the festival, Pacino was presented with the Glory to the Filmmaker! Award and the film won the Queer Lion award.

The United States premiere of Wilde Salomé was held on March 21, 2012, at the Castro Theatre in San Francisco's Castro District. Marking the 130th anniversary of Oscar Wilde's visit to San Francisco, the premiere was a fundraiser for the GLBT Historical Society, with 1,000 tickets reserved for sale to the public.

A new version of the film without the documentary elements, titled Salomé, was released on August 10, 2013 in the United States and on September 21, 2014 in the United Kingdom and Ireland.

Cast
 Al Pacino as himself / King Herod
 Jessica Chastain as Salome
 Kevin Anderson as himself / John the Baptist
 Estelle Parsons as herself
 Roxanne Hart as Herodias
 Barry Navidi as himself
 Joe Roseto as The Young Syrian / Narraboth / Captain of the Guard / Himself
 Jack Stehlin as Nazarene / Jewish Leader / Himself
 Steve Roman as the Cappadocian
 Ozman Sirgood as King Herod / Desert Sequence
 Geoffrey Owens as Tigellinus / Himself

Reception
On review aggregator Rotten Tomatoes, the film holds an approval rating of 80%, based on 15 reviews with an average rating of 6.32/10. Metacritic gives the film a weighted average score of 65 out of 100, based on 6 critics, indicating "generally favorable reviews".

References

External links
 

2011 films
2011 drama films
2011 documentary films
2010s American films
2010s English-language films
American docudrama films
Documentary films about theatre
Cultural depictions of John the Baptist
Films based on the Gospels
Films based on Salome (play)
Films directed by Al Pacino
Films scored by Jeff Beal